The Waldstadion Homburg is the home stadium of Oberliga Südwest club FC 08 Homburg. It has a spectator capacity of 16,488. In the three seasons — 1986–87, 1987–88 and 1989–90 — that Homburg were in the Bundesliga the average attendance was less than 8,000 per game.

References

Football venues in Germany
FC 08 Homburg
Homburg, Saarland
Sports venues in Saarland
Buildings and structures in Saarpfalz-Kreis